"Heart to Break" is a song by German singer-songwriter Kim Petras. It was released on February 14, 2018. The music video was released on April 26, 2018. The track was produced by Dr. Luke and Cirkut, and written by Luke, Cirkut, and Petras as well as Aaron Joseph and Jacob Kasher. It is the sixth of eleven singles that form the artist's unofficial project Era 1.

Background and composition
In an interview with Billboard, Petras stated "['Heart To Break'] was kind of summing up my heartbreak experiences but making a fun song about them. It's describing the part of you that is about to make a mistake and knows you’re making a mistake, but you don’t care because you still want to jump in and do it." Later in their review of the song, Bryan Kress described the song as an "upbeat, unabashed pop sound" that "ventures into new territory for the songwriter as she confronts a bad relationship while trying to squeeze as much fun from it while it lasts." He later states "The lyrical tightrope of the situation was no easy feat for Petras", who was inspired by "Heart of Glass" by Blondie and "Lovefool" by The Cardigans.

Music video
In its coverage of the video premiere for the song, Paper wrote the video "imagines Petras as a modern-day princess pining for her prince in a surreal purple and blue crystal tower. Instead of being confined to the castle like Rapunzel was, however, Petras roams around the inky landscape outside, eventually having a dance-off with her love interest, breaking glass picture frames, and enticing him before eventually turning to glass and breaking herself."

Reception
Billboard ranked the single as the best Era 1 single, calling it "a master class" and pointing out that "if this is the quality of pop music she’s able to serve up so early in her career, we’re going to be paying attention to Petras for years to come". In 2018, Petras performed it at the Stern TV and at the VBuild Series along with "Hills", "Hillside Boys" and "Can't Do Better". In 2019, she performed the song at the Equality Awards along with "Icy" and "Sweet Spot". In 2020, Petras also performed it during HBO Pride Live along with "Malibu" and "Blow It All".

Track listing

Charts

References

2018 singles
2018 songs
Kim Petras songs
Songs written by Kim Petras
Songs written by Cirkut (record producer)
Songs written by Dr. Luke
Songs written by Jacob Kasher
Song recordings produced by Cirkut (record producer)
Song recordings produced by Dr. Luke